Mönkkönen is a Finnish surname. Notable people with the surname include:

Eric Henry Monkkonen (1942–2005), American historian
Jukka Mönkkönen (born 1959), Finnish pharmacist

Finnish-language surnames